Cârligele is a commune located in Vrancea County, Romania. It is composed of four villages: Blidari, Bonțești, Cârligele and Dălhăuți.

References

Communes in Vrancea County
Localities in Muntenia